Yousef Al-Kubaisi (Arabic:يوسف الكبيسي) (born 16 March 1993) is a Qatari footballer who plays as a forward.

Career
Al-Kubaisi started his career at Qatar SC and is a product of the Qatar's youth system. On 22 December 2012, Al-Kubaisi made his professional debut for Qatar SC against Al-Rayyan in the Pro League, replacing Mohammed Razak. He landed with Qatar SC from the Qatar Stars League to the Qatari Second Division in 2015-16 season. And ent up with Qatar SC from the Qatari Second Division to the Qatar Stars League in the 2016-17 season.

References

External links

Qatari footballers
Qatar SC players
Qatar Stars League players
Qatari Second Division players
Association football forwards
Place of birth missing (living people)
Living people
1993 births